This is a comprehensive list of awards and honours bestowed upon the Cuban revolutionary and statesman Fidel Alejandro Castro Ruz (except things named after him).

Private awards

State decorations 

Prizes of Cuba, other states, state institutions and subnationals entities.

References 

Castro, Fidel
Fidel Castro